Lake Brook is a river in Delaware County, New York. It drains Odell Lake and flows south before converging with the West Branch Delaware River west of Hobart.

References

Rivers of New York (state)
Rivers of Delaware County, New York
Tributaries of the West Branch Delaware River